The William & Mary Tribe men's basketball team competes in Division I of the National Collegiate Athletic Association (NCAA), representing the College of William & Mary in the Colonial Athletic Association. William & Mary has played its home games at Kaplan Arena at William & Mary Hall in Williamsburg, Virginia since 1971.

Seasons

References

 
William and Mary
William & Mary Tribe basketball seasons